Mufhasa (foaled 7 September 2004), was a New Zealand Thoroughbred racehorse who won a number of Group races in New Zealand and Australia in a career stretching from 2007 to 2013. He was known as King Mufhasa in Australia.
  
Mufhasa was trained by Stephen McKee and ridden in the majority of his races by Samantha Spratt.  Towards the end of his career he was trained by Bruce Wallace and he was cared for throughout his career by strapper Amy Doran.

His win in the 2012 Windsor Park Plate was his tenth and final Group 1 victory. 

Mufhasa was voted the New Zealand Horse of the Year for the 2009 and 2012 seasons.  In 2021 he was inducted into the New Zealand Racing Hall of Fame.

References

External links
  Pedigree of Mufhasa

See also
 Thoroughbred racing in New Zealand

2004 racehorse births
Racehorses bred in New Zealand
Racehorses trained in New Zealand